The Compendious Book on Calculation by Completion and Balancing, also known as al-Jabr, is an Iranian mathematical treatise on algebra written in Baghdad around 820 CE by the Persian polymath Muḥammad ibn Mūsā al-Khwārizmī. It was a landmark work in the history of mathematics, establishing algebra as an independent discipline.

Al-Jabr provided an exhaustive account of solving for the positive roots of polynomial equations up to the second degree. It was the first text to teach elementary algebra, and the first to teach algebra for its own sake. It also introduced the fundamental concept of "reduction" and "balancing" (which the term al-jabr originally referred to), the transposition of subtracted terms to the other side of an equation, i.e. the cancellation of like terms on opposite sides of the equation. Mathematics historian Victor J. Katz regards Al-Jabr as the first true algebra text that is still extant. Translated into Latin by Robert of Chester in 1145, it was used until the sixteenth century as the principal mathematical textbook of European universities.

Several authors have also published texts under this name, including Abū Ḥanīfa al-Dīnawarī, Abū Kāmil Shujā ibn Aslam, Abū Muḥammad al-ʿAdlī, Abū Yūsuf al-Miṣṣīṣī, 'Abd al-Hamīd ibn Turk, Sind ibn ʿAlī, Sahl ibn Bišr, and Šarafaddīn al-Ṭūsī.

Legacy
R. Rashed and Angela Armstrong write:

J. J. O'Connor and E. F. Robertson wrote in the MacTutor History of Mathematics archive:

The book
The book was a compilation and extension of known rules for solving quadratic equations and for some other problems, and considered to be the foundation of algebra, establishing it as an independent discipline. The word algebra is derived from the name of one of the basic operations with equations described in this book, following its Latin translation by Robert of Chester.

Quadratic equations 

The book classifies quadratic equations to one of the six basic types and provides algebraic and geometric methods to solve the basic ones. Historian Carl Boyer notes the following regarding the lack of modern abstract notations in the book:

Thus the equations are verbally described in terms of "squares" (what would today be "x2"), "roots" (what would today be "x") and "numbers" ("constants": ordinary spelled out numbers, like 'forty-two'). The six types, with modern notations, are:
 squares equal roots (ax2 = bx)
 squares equal number (ax2 = c)
 roots equal number (bx = c)
 squares and roots equal number (ax2 + bx = c)
 squares and number equal roots (ax2 + c = bx)
 roots and number equal squares (bx + c = ax2)

Islamic mathematicians, unlike the Hindus, did not deal with negative numbers at all; hence an equation like bx + c = 0 does not appear in the classification, because it has no positive solutions if all the coefficients are positive. Similarly equation types 4, 5 and 6, which look equivalent to the modern eye, were distinguished because the coefficients must all be positive.

The al-ğabr ("forcing", "restoring") operation is moving a deficient quantity from one side of the equation to the other side. In an al-Khwarizmi's example (in modern notation), "x2 = 40x − 4x2" is transformed by al-ğabr into "5x2 = 40x". Repeated application of this rule eliminates negative quantities from calculations.

Al-Muqabala ("balancing" or "corresponding") means subtraction of the same positive quantity from both sides: "x2 + 5 = 40x + 4x2" is turned into "5 = 40x + 3x2". Repeated application of this rule makes quantities of each type ("square"/"root"/"number") appear in the equation at most once, which helps to see that there are only 6 basic solvable types of the problem, when restricted to positive coefficients and solutions. 

Subsequent parts of the book do not rely on solving quadratic equations.

Area and volume 
The second chapter of the book catalogues methods of finding area and volume. These include approximations of pi (π), given three ways, as 3 1/7, √10, and 62832/20000. This latter approximation, equalling 3.1416, earlier appeared in the Indian Āryabhaṭīya (499 CE).

Other topics 
Al-Khwārizmī explicates the Jewish calendar and the 19-year cycle described by the convergence of lunar months and solar years.

About half of the book deals with Islamic rules of inheritance, which are complex and require skill in first-order algebraic equations.

References

Notes

Citations

Further reading 
 Barnabas B. Hughes, ed., Robert of Chester's Latin Translation of Al-Khwarizmi's Al-Jabr: A New Critical Edition, (in Latin) Wiesbaden: F. Steiner Verlag, 1989. 

 R. Rashed, The development of Arabic mathematics: between arithmetic and algebra, London, 1994.

External links

19th Century English Translation at the Internet Archive
Al-Khwarizmi
Annotated excerpt from a translation of the Compendious Book. University of Duisburg-Essen.
The Compendious Book on Calculation by Completion and Balancing – in the Arabic original with an English translation (PDF)

History of algebra
Mathematical works of the medieval Islamic world
Scientific works of the Abbasid Caliphate
9th-century Arabic books
Mathematics textbooks